Baresmanas was an eminent Sassanian Persian general. He is known only from his participation in the Battle of Dara in 530 against the Byzantines led by Belisarius, recorded by Procopius of Caesarea. In this battle, Baresmanas was the second-in-command of the Persian army under Perozes, and was killed during the fight by Sunicas. According to the account of Procopius, he was one-eyed.

References

530 deaths
Generals of Kavad I
Military personnel killed in action
People of the Roman–Sasanian Wars
Year of birth unknown
6th-century Iranian people
Iberian War